The Murchison letter was a political scandal during the 1888 US presidential election between Grover Cleveland, the Democratic incumbent, and the Republican nominee, Benjamin Harrison. The letter was sent by Sir Lionel Sackville-West to "Charles F. Murchison," who was actually a political operative posing as a British expatriate. In the letter, Sackville-West suggested that Cleveland was preferred as president from the British point of view. The Republicans published this letter just two weeks before the election and turned many Irish-American voters away from Cleveland. That made him lose New York State and Indiana and thus the presidency. Sackville-West was sacked as British ambassador.

History
A California Republican, George Osgoodby,  wrote a letter to Sir Lionel Sackville-West, the British ambassador to the United States, under the assumed name of "Charles F. Murchison", who described himself as a former Englishman who was now a California citizen and asked how he should vote in the upcoming presidential election. Sackville-West wrote back and indiscreetly suggested that Grover Cleveland, the Democratic incumbent, was probably the best man from the British point of view:

The Republicans published the letter just two weeks before the election, and it had a galvanizing effect on Irish-American voters exactly comparable to the "Rum, Romanism, and Rebellion" blunder of the previous presidential election: by trumpeting Great Britain's support for the Democrats. That drove Irish-American voters into the Republican fold, and Cleveland lost the presidency. Following the election, the lame-duck Cleveland administration brought about Sackville-West's removal as ambassador by citing not only Sackville-West's letter, which could have been defended as a private correspondence unintended for publication, but also the content of his subsequent interviews, such as one with a reporter for the New York Herald:

On October 1, Sackville-West had become Lord Sackville, due to the death of his brother Mortimer Sackville-West, 1st Baron Sackville. 

Cleveland returned to the White House by winning the 1892 election.

See also
 Anglophobia#United States

Notes

References

Further reading
 Brooks, George.  "Anglophobia in the United States: Some Light on the Presidential Election." Westminster Review (130.1 (1888): 736-756 online, a primary source
 Campbell, Charles S.  "The Dismissal of Lord Sackville." Mississippi Valley Historical Review 44.4 (1958): 635-648 online.
 Hinckley, T. C. "George Osgoodby and the Murchison Letter." Pacific Historical Review (1958): 359-370. in JSTOR
 Newmark, Marco R. "The Murchison Letter Incident." The Quarterly: Historical Society of Southern California 27.1 (1945): 17-21. in JSTOR
 Oberholtzer, Ellis Paxson. A History of the United States since the Civil War. Volume V, 1888–1901 (1937). pp 58–64

1888 United States presidential election
Election scandals in the United States
Political controversies in the United States
1889 in American politics
United Kingdom–United States relations
Political scandals in the United Kingdom
1888 in the United Kingdom
1888 documents
Letters (message)